Ceramica  is a genus of moths of the family Noctuidae.

Species
 Ceramica picta – zebra caterpillar (Harris, 1841)
 Ceramica pisi – broom moth (Linnaeus, 1758)

References
 Ceramica at Markku Savela's Lepidoptera and Some Other Life Forms
Natural History Museum Lepidoptera genus database

 
Hadenini